Trávnica is a village and municipality in the Nové Zámky District in the Nitra Region of south-west Slovakia.

History
In historical records the village was first mentioned in 1075.

Geography
The municipality lies at an altitude of 130 metres and covers an area of 21.155 km². It has a population of about 1185 people.

Ethnicity
The population is about 98% Slovak

Facilities
The village has a small public library and a football pitch.

External links
 
 
 http://www.statistics.sk/mosmis/eng/run.html
 Trávnica - Nové Zámky Okolie

Villages and municipalities in Nové Zámky District